Tara Naro (born 22 May 1896, date of death unknown) was a Japanese equestrian. He competed in two events at the 1932 Summer Olympics.

References

External links

1896 births
Year of death missing
Japanese male equestrians
Olympic equestrians of Japan
Equestrians at the 1932 Summer Olympics
Place of birth missing